Robert William Chouinard (born May 1, 1972) is a Filipino-American former Major League Baseball right-handed pitcher. He is the only person born in the Philippines to play Major League Baseball.

Chouinard played high school baseball at Forest Grove High School in Forest Grove, Oregon.

Drafted by the Baltimore Orioles in the fifth round of the 1990 MLB amateur draft, Chouinard made his Major League Baseball debut with the Oakland Athletics on May 26, 1996, and appeared in his final major league game on September 9, 2001, with the Colorado Rockies.

He was traded from the Orioles to the Athletics along with Allen Plaster on January 15, 1993, for Harold Baines. 

Chouinard was arrested on Christmas Day in 1999 following an incident in which he held a loaded gun to his wife's head and made her beg for her life. In 2000, Chouinard pleaded guilty to aggravated assault and was sentenced to four increments of three-month prison terms during baseball's offseasons. He was allowed 42 hours to work out at Coors Field and visit with his family every week. He was also ordered to make a $25,000 donation to a domestic violence charity and appear in ten public service announcements.

References

External links

1972 births
American baseball players of Filipino descent
American expatriate baseball players in Canada
American people convicted of assault
American sportspeople convicted of crimes
Arizona Diamondbacks players
Bridgeport Bluefish players
Colorado Rockies players
Edmonton Trappers players
Filipino emigrants to the United States
Living people
Major League Baseball pitchers
Major League Baseball players from the Philippines
Milwaukee Brewers players
Oakland Athletics players
People from Forest Grove, Oregon
Prisoners and detainees of Arizona
Sportspeople from Manila